Huh7 is an immortalised cell line and may be grown in the laboratory for research purposes. According to the web site huh7.com, it is "a well differentiated hepatocyte-derived carcinoma cell line, originally taken from a liver tumor in a 57-year-old Japanese male in 1982." It is used extensively in hepatitis C and dengue virus research.

Huh7 cells have been instrumental in hepatitis C research. Until 2005, it was not possible to culture hepatitis C in the laboratory. The introduction of the Huh7 cell line permitted screening of drug candidates against laboratory-cultured hepatitis C virus and permitted the development of new drugs against hepatitis C.

In February 2022 it has been reported that the Huh7 cells can  at least parts of the code of the mRNA from the BNT162b2 vaccine reverse transcribed into DNA (the study doesn't proof that that DNA is integrated) via intracellular transverse transcription.

References

External links
 Cellosaurus entry for Huh7

Human cell lines